Statistics of Hong Kong Second Division League in the 1935/1936 season.

Overview
Royal Navy won the championship.

League table

References
RSSSF

2
Hong Kong Second Division League seasons